Durong is a rural locality in the South Burnett Region, Queensland, Australia.

Geography
The Chinchilla – Wondai Road (State Route 82) passes through from south-west to east, while the Mundubbera – Durong Road (State Route 75) enters from the north and terminates in a T-intersection with State Route 82.

Durong South is a neighbourhood in the centre of the locailty.

History 
Durong Provisional School opened on 3 September 1923. On 7 November 1927, it became Durong State School. The school closed briefly in 1928 due to low student numbers. The closure of Boondooma State School in 1968 enabled Durong State School to be renamed Boondooma State School in 1970, which closed on December 1999. The school was at 9359 Mundubbera Durong Road in neighbouring Boondooma.

Durong South State School opened on 24 May 1925.

The Durong Public Hall opened on Saturday 14 April 1934. It replaced a smaller building one quarter of the size.

Durong Baptist Church was officially  opened on the weekend of 4-5 August 1934 by Alfred Hemsley Richer (President of the Queensland Baptist Union).

Sacred Heart Catholic Church was officially opened on Sunday 6 March 1966 by Archbishop Patrick O'Donnell. It was built on land donated by Mr and Mrs Graham Stuart Bond. It closed in 2022. It was at 8960 Chinchilla Wondai Road.

The Durong library opened in 1991.

Heritage listings 

Durong has a number of heritage-listed sites, including:
 Burrandowan Station Homestead, Kingaroy Road

Education 

Durong South State School is a government primary (Early Childhood-6) school for boys and girls at 10463 Mundubbera Durong Road. In 2017, the school had an enrolment of 19 students with  5 teachers (2 full-time equivalent) and 5 non-teaching staff (2 full-time equivalent).

There are no secondary schools in Durong. The nearest government secondary schools are Jandowae State School (to Year 10) in Jandowae to the south and Proston State School in Proston to the north-east. There are no nearby secondary schools to Year 12, the nearest is Kingaroy State High School in Kingaroy to the south-east. Other options are distance education and boarding schools.

Amenities 
Durong Hall is at 8940 Chinchilla Wondai. The South Burnett Regional Council operates a public library at the hall.

Holy Trinity Anglican Church is at 8950 Chinchilla Wondai Road.

Durong Bowls Club is at 8951 Chinchilla Wondai Road.

Attractions 
Durong Dingo Sanctuary is a facility that maintains pure bred dingos, keeping them safe from 1080 baiting, trapping, and shooting. It can be visited by the public by appointment.

References

Further reading 

 

South Burnett Region
Localities in Queensland